
 
 

Charleston Conservation Park is a protected area located in the Australian state of South Australia in the locality of Charleston in the Adelaide Hills state government region about  east of the state capital of Adelaide and about  north of the town centre in Lobethal.

The conservation park consists of land in section 3943 in the cadastral unit of the Hundred of Onkaparinga. It was proclaimed under the National Parks and Wildlife Act 1972 on 8 April 1976.

In 1980, it was described as follows:Charleston Conservation Park preserves a pristine remnant representative of the transition between the wetter stringy bark forests on the western side of the Mount Lofty Ranges and the drier mallee woodlands to the east. A large diversity of flora and fauna are represented in the park including at least seventy-six bird species. An area of gently undulating relief featuring three main woodland associations. These being, a Casuarina stricta association with scattered Eucalyptus leucoxylon / E. viminalis, a E. leucoxylon association and a Banksia marginata association. The understorey is dominated by Acacia pycnantha with occasional thickets of Leptospermum myrsinoides and Xanthorrhoea semiplana. Small, regenerating stands of Acacia melanoxylon and Callitris preissii are of interest. Charleston Conservation Park is in a near pristine condition despite its cultural surrounds, having never been grazed…

The conservation park is classified as an IUCN Category III protected area. In 1980, it was listed on the now-defunct Register of the National Estate.

See also
Protected areas of South Australia

References

External links
Charleston Conservation Park webpage on the Protected Planet website
Charleston Conservation Park webpage on the BirdsSA website

Conservation parks of South Australia
Protected areas established in 1976
1976 establishments in Australia
Adelaide Hills
South Australian places listed on the defunct Register of the National Estate